In female human anatomy, Skene's glands or the Skene glands (also known as the lesser vestibular glands, paraurethral glands) are glands located around the lower end of the urethra. The glands are surrounded by tissue that swells with blood during sexual arousal, and secrete a fluid from openings near the urethra, particularly during orgasm.

Structure and function

The Skene's glands are located in the vestibule of the vulva, around the lower end of the urethra. The two Skene's ducts lead from the Skene's glands to the vulvar vestibule, to the left and right of the urethral opening, from which they are structurally capable of secreting fluid. Although there remains debate about the function of the Skene's glands, one purpose is to secrete a fluid that helps lubricate the urethral opening.

Skene's glands produce a milk-like ultrafiltrate of blood plasma. The glands may be the source of female ejaculation, but this has not been proven. Because they and the male prostate act similarly by secreting prostate-specific antigen (PSA), which is an ejaculate protein produced in males, and of prostate-specific acid phosphatase, some authors refer to the Skene's glands as the "female prostate". It is homologous to the male prostate (developed from the same embryological tissues), but its homology is still a matter of research. Female ejaculate may result from sexual activity for some women, especially during orgasm. In addition to PSA and acid phosphatase, Skene's gland fluid contains high concentrations of glucose and fructose.

In an amount of a few milliliters, fluid is secreted from these glands when stimulated from inside the vagina. Female ejaculation and squirting (secretion of large amounts of fluid) are believed by researchers to be two different processes. They may occur in combination during orgasm. Squirting alone is a sudden expulsion of liquid that at least partly comes from the bladder and contains urine, whereas ejaculation fluid includes a whitish transparent ejaculate that appears to come from the Skene's gland.

Clinical significance

Disorders of the Skene's glands may include:
 Infection (called skenitis, urethral syndrome, or female prostatitis)
 Skene's duct cyst: lined by stratified squamous epithelium, the cyst is caused by obstruction of the Skene's glands. It is located lateral to the urinary meatus. Magnetic resonance imaging (MRI) is used for diagnosis. The cyst is treated by surgical excision or marsupialization.
 Trichomoniasis: the Skene's glands (along with other structures) act as a reservoir for Trichomonas vaginalis, indicating that topical treatments are not as effective as oral medication.

History
While the glands were first described in 1672 by Regnier de Graaf and by the French surgeon Alphonse Guérin (1816–1895), they were named after the Scottish gynaecologist Alexander Skene, who wrote about it in Western medical literature in 1880. In 2002, the term female prostate as a second term after paraurethral gland was added in Terminologia Histologica by the Federative International Committee on Anatomical Terminology. The 2008 edition notes that the term was introduced "because of the morphological and immunological significance of the structure".

See also

 Bartholin's gland
 List of related male and female reproductive organs
 Mesonephric duct
 Pudendal nerve
 Vaginal lubrication

References

Further reading
 

Glands
Exocrine system
Mammal female reproductive system
Anatomy named for one who described it